The 2018–19 Duke Blue Devils women's basketball team will represent Duke University during the 2018–19 NCAA Division I women's basketball season. Returning as head coach was Joanne P. McCallie entering her 12th season. The team plays its home games at Cameron Indoor Stadium in Durham, North Carolina as members of the Atlantic Coast Conference. They finished the season 15–15, 6–10 in ACC play to finish in a tie for tenth place. They advanced to the second round of the ACC women's tournament where they lost to Florida State.

Previous season
The 2017-18 Blue Devils finished the season 24–9, 11–5 in ACC play to finish tied for fourth place in the regular season. They were the fourth seed in the ACC women's tournament, where they lost their first game to NC State.  The received and at large bid to the 2018 NCAA Division I women's basketball tournament, and were seeded fifth in the Albany region.  They beat Belmont and Georgia before losing to Connecticut in the Sweet 16.

Off-season

Recruiting Class

Source:

Roster

Rankings
2018–19 NCAA Division I women's basketball rankings

^Coaches did not release a Week 2 poll.

Schedule

|-
!colspan=12 style="background:#001A57; color:#FFFFFF;"| Exhibition

|-
!colspan=12 style="background:#001A57; color:#FFFFFF;"| Non-conference regular season

|-
!colspan=12 style="background:#001A57; color:#FFFFFF;"| ACC Regular Season

|-
!colspan=12 style="background:#001A57;"| ACC Women's Tournament

Source

See also
 2018–19 Duke Blue Devils men's basketball team

References

Duke Blue Devils women's basketball seasons
Duke